David Shenton (May 20, 1949) is a British cartoonist who specializes in queer comics. Shenton is known for his work “Controlled Hysteria,” Stanley and The Mask of Mystery, and Phobia Phobia. His comic strips have been featured in the collections Strips Aids, No Straight Lines, and AARGH.

Biography
Shenton was born on May 20, 1949 in Ashton-under-Lyne, Lancashire. In 1965 he attended Ashton-under-Lyne College of Further Education and in 1967 he studied printed textiles at Loughborough College of Art. He received his teaching certificate at Leeds University in 1971. Shenton has been an illustrator of LGBTQ comics since the 1970s and has addressed social issues including same-sex marriage and the aids crisis. His early comics can be found in gay newspapers like Gay News, Him, and Capital Gay. As a freelance artist, his work has been featured in the Guardian Building Design, Gay News, Disability Now, Solicitors' Journal, and Opticians. In addition to his art career, Shenton has taught literacy at Norwich Prison, Hackney College, and the Education Department of the London Zoo. His book Stanley and The Mask of Mystery was published in 1983 by Gay Men's Press. In 1988, New Zealand publication Pink Triangle said that Shenton and fellow cartoonist Alison Bechdel were "in the forefront of cartooning in the late 80s." In 2020, the BBC produced a video feature of Shenton and his comics as part of Norwich Pride. Currently, he posts comics daily on his Facebook page .

Bibliography

Publications 
 Shenton, David. Get Her! Dscomics.uk, 2008.
 Shenton, David. Phobia Phobia. Third House, 1988.
 Shenton, David. Salomé. Text by Oscar Wilde. Quartet Books, 1986.
 Shenton, David. Stanley and the Mask of Mystery. Gay Men's Press, 1983.
 Shenton, David. Bananas Are Not the Only Fruit. Stonewall Press, 1993.
 Charlesworth, Kate. Shenton, David. Drawn Out & Painted Pink. Cath Tate Cards, 2009.

Contributions 
 AARGH! Mad Love, 1988.
 Hall, Justin. No Straight Lines: Four Decades of Queer Comics. Fantagraphics Books, 2013.
 Melia, D. Strip AIDS. Willyprods/Small Time Ink, 1987.

Personal life
Shenton's work has been featured in British newspapers, journals, magazines, and T-shirts. He uploads new comics to his Facebook page daily. Shenton and his partner John have been together for 17 years and he appears in many of Shenton's Facebook comics. He regularly participates in LGBTQ+ meetings, marches, and events in London and Cromer of Norfolk.

References/Notes and references
 “David Shenton.”  Retrieved 2019-11-13.
 "David Shenton. These Foolish Things."  Retrieved 2019-10-8.
 “Norwich Pride: Gay Cartoonist David Shenton on the Decades after Stonewall.”  Retrieved 2019-10-8.

References

External links
 

LGBT comics creators
1949 births
Living people
21st-century LGBT people